St. Francis of Assisi Church, also known as the Emperor's Jubilee Church and the Mexico Church, is a Basilica-style Catholic church in Vienna, Austria. Built between 1898 and 1910, it was consecrated in 1913. It is located on the Mexikoplatz in Vienna's Second District, Leopoldstadt, and is administered by the Order of the Holy Trinity.

History
The construction of the church celebrated the 50th anniversary of the reign of Emperor Franz Joseph I of Austria. A competition was held to select the design and was won by architect Victor Luntz. The four-bay, basilica-like brick building was intended as a garrison church; designed in the Rhenish-Romanesque style, its three red-tiled towers are visible several kilometres away.

The church, which is directly situated near the Danube, is now home to the Vienna English Speaking Catholic Community (VESCC) who have held weekly masses at the church since moving there in 2009.

The Mexikoplatz (Mexico Square), formerly known as Erzherzog-Karl-Platz (Archduke-Karl-Square), commemorates the fact that Mexico was the only country outside the Soviet Union to protest against the Anschluss of Austria to Nazi Germany.

Elisabethkapelle

The Art Nouveau-style Elisabethkapelle (Elizabeth Chapel) is located on the left of the church next to the choir. It is 13.5 meters high and 10 metres wide. The octagonal chapel is modeled on the Palatine Chapel in the Aachen Cathedral, which was itself modelled on the Cappella Palatina in Palermo.

In 1898, the Italian anarchist Luigi Lucheni assassinated the wife of Emperor Franz Joseph I of Austria, Empress Elisabeth of Austria (commonly referred to as Sisi). To commemorate her, the Elisabethkapelle was established. It was financed through donations from the Red Cross, as Empress Elisabeth was the first Protector of the Red Cross.

Because of the Red Cross's large donation of 348,348 crowns, the chapel was decorated with gold mosaics rather than frescoes, and the walls were covered in marble rather than stucco. The mosaics were designed by Secession artist Carl Ederer. On the vault of the chancel there is a large mosaic of Saint Elizabeth of Hungary.

The chapel was completed in 1907 and consecrated on 10 June 1908.

References

Gallery

External links

Vienna English Speaking Catholic Community (VESCC)
The Church of St. Francis of Assisi (The World Factbook)

Roman Catholic churches in Vienna
20th-century Roman Catholic church buildings in Austria
Art Nouveau architecture in Vienna
Roman Catholic churches completed in 1913
Art Nouveau church buildings in Austria
Trinitarian Order
1913 establishments in Austria